Birds, Beasts, & Flowers is a split EP between indie rock band The Autumn Defense and indie folk band Hem. It was released on September 28, 2004 on the Arena Rock Recording Co. label.

Track listing
 "Half Acre" (Hem)
 "Bluebirds Fall" (The Autumn Defense)
 "Pacific Street" (Hem)
 "You Know Where I Live" (The Autumn Defense)
 "St. Charlene"  (Hem)
 "Mayday" (The Autumn Defense)

References 

Hem (band) albums
2004 EPs
Arena Rock Recording Company EPs
Split EPs
The Autumn Defense albums